The 22455 / 22456 Sainagar Shirdi–Kalka Superfast Express is a Express train belonging to Indian Railways Northern Railway zone that run between  and  in India.

Service 
It operates as train number 22455 from Sainagar Shirdi to Kalka and as train number 22456  in the reverse direction, serving the states of Maharashtra, Madhya Pradesh, Uttar Pradesh, Delhi, Haryana & Chandigarh.

Schedule

Coach composition
 1 AC II Tier
 2 AC III Tier
 5 Sleeper Coaches
 6 General
 2 Second-class Luggage/parcel van

As with most train services in India, coach composition may be amended at the discretion of Indian Railways depending on demand.

Routeing

Traction
The train is hauled by a Ghaziabad-based WAP-7 locomotive from end to end.

Rake sharing
The train sharing its rake with 14503/14504 Kalka–Shri Mata Vaishno Devi Katra Express.

References

External links
22455 Sainagar Shirdi Kalka Express at India Rail Info
22456 Kalka Sainagar Shirdi Express at India Rail Info

Express trains in India
Rail transport in Maharashtra
Rail transport in Madhya Pradesh
Rail transport in Uttar Pradesh
Rail transport in Delhi
Rail transport in Haryana
Transport in Kalka
Transport in Shirdi